The Little Long March was a , two-month withdrawal by Left-Guomindang forces up the Ganjiang River and down to the coast, subsequent to the successful mutiny and insurrection at Nanchang on August 1, 1927.

Withdrawal of liberated troops
Facing a counter-attack from Right-Guomindang (Chiang Kai-shek-affiliated Nationalist) regiments moving up from Jiujiang, the Revolutionary Committee—basically Zhou Enlai, Li Lisan and their Comintern military advisor Kunanin—decided to evacuate the city and make for the southern port of Shantou, Guangdong, in the hope of receiving a Soviet arms shipment. Once supplied they would attempt a return to the provincial capital Guangzhou and thence a new and proper dissemination of Left-Guomindang/Communist influence throughout the province from which most of the insurrection's soldiery had come. He Long strongly opposed this idea: he pointed out that marching such a great distance and over such terrain in the heat of summer would put a severe strain on the troops.  He also pointed out that the popular support for the communists in Guangdong was merely a fraction of what they enjoyed among the peasantry in Hunan, the province where he had thrived by brigandage since 1913. Resupply and local enlistment were assured. Why should the new base not be established somewhere in its vast border regions?

He Long's suggestion was vetoed—Guangzhou, springboard of the Northern Expedition, was the target set by the ComIntern. Accordingly, on August 5 the 25,000 Left-Guomindang troops began the 600 km march to the South China Seacoast.  The Communists would pay a hefty price for their obeisance two months later in the rout known as the Battle of Shantou.

By the 8th, only three days out, a third of the Uprising troops had deserted. On the 19th, the column entered Ruijin. Reconnaissance had found Right-Guomindang forces at Huichang, the next county town to the south. On the following morning the Battle of Huichang pitted brother officers, graduates of the Huangpu (Whampoa) Military Academy, against one another in close combat. Ye Ting's 11th Army arrived late and He Long's 20th bore the brunt. The Nanchang Mutineers took nearly a thousand casualties, half of them dead. The Right-Guomindang evacuated the town under cover of night. The Left would not pursue them; their route lay east, over the divide into Fujian.

In the aftermath of battle, He Long swore allegiance to the Chinese Communist Party, witnessed by Zhou Enlai, Li Lisan and Zhang Guotao. At the other end of Asia, Pravda hailed the advent of a new, partisan, Workers' and Peasants' Red Army. For Joseph Stalin this was ample proof that the ComIntern's line was being correct, and Leon Trotsky thus incorrect to be questioning it.

Down the Tingjiang

Having rested at the headwaters of the Ganjiang, the Liberated troops filed over into Changting Prefecture. The best combat troops formed the vanguard, they were soon 20 miles and two days' march ahead of the rear. Most of the leaders of the revolutionary committee and Nanchang civilian sympathisers were in the main section. The rearguard, 200 troops under Li Lisan, had the wounded and the baggage and veteran peasant activist Peng Pai; it is said that 1000 women of the area, some widowed, perhaps by war, joined them as carriers.

At the prefectural centre in early September, Li commandeered 100 boats each with her crew of four to take the wounded and weak down the Tingjiang river to Shanghang county; not letting the crews sort themselves out resulted in costly accidents. The Chaozhou-Shantou (潮汕) area, their destination, and the hope of Muscovite reinforcement, lay much further downstream.

In the meantime, other Left-KMT troops had convened at Wenjiashi (文家市), on Jiangxi's western border, ostensibly for a similar uprising (Autumn Harvest), this to seize Changsha for the Hankow government. The troops instead found themselves commandeered by Mao Zedong and marched south up into the Jinggang mountains.

And so it was that by the end of September, with their Nanchang troops poised above Shantou, the Communists knew that their uprisings had yet to take and keep one city from the Rightists. The Jiang-affiliated KMT or warlord forces were even now moving in to trap the Left Mutineers with the sea at their backs. The Com-Intern's Hong Kong station sent word that they should avoid further battles, forgo Shantou port (where in any event Soviet arms would not be forthcoming) and take cover like the Wenjiashi troops, and furthermore establish a rural soviet in Peng's hometown. There was now, however, no avoiding the Rightist hammer: Ye and He lost two-fifths of their troop strength in battle at Fengshun County-town. In belated accordance with the Com-Intern directive, Ye circled down to Shanwei, lending peasant leader Peng a triumphant return to his home town Haifeng.

Refugee force

Zhu, who in the battle had minded the northern front, marched his 1,000 troops back up into Jiangxi and over its western ridges into Hunan. Zhu finally found refuge for his mutineers' regiment with the Yizhang County warlord - though he and fellow communist Chen Yi thought it best to live incognito while here.

In 1928 April Zhu's force had expanded to 10,000 and he marched them into the Jinggang (井冈) stretch of the borderlands, there to join the survivors of Mao's uprising.

Down but not out in Hong Kong

Other surviving members were much less fortunate; all became fugitives. Zhou Enlai, now seriously ill, unarmed save for a pistol or two and incommunicado save for the company of Ye Jianying (and some say Ye Ting too) made it to Hong Kong, the largest and safest of China's foreign concessions. Nie Rongzhen too arrived there.

Zhang Guotao and Li Lisan holed up in the small fishing port of Tiazugang but soon also arrived in Hong Kong. They were made to write reports on the Nanchang Uprising—in Li's case this was preparatory to his taking the blame for the entire episode. Disguised as businessmen, they took a passenger liner to Shanghai, there to be held in a safe house on Chungking (Chongqing) Road. Eventually they, along with Zhou, were expelled from the Politburo.

Elsewhere

He Long went home alone after the defeat.  Reduced from an army commander in charge of tens of thousands of men to a beggar, he was not well received by his family except a few who were already communists. He was to raise another 3000 soldier-strong force in his homeland but it too would be wiped out by the Right-KMT (with just over 30 survivors). Only a year later would He Long again command a formidable force.

Other fugitives of the rout at Fengshun included Liu Bocheng, who hooked up with communist sympathisers and was eventually sent to Moscow for military training.  Lin Biao, incommunicado for a time, returned to the surviving uprising force in flight from hostile locals.  Guo Moruo sailed to Japan.

Notes and references

Conflicts in 1927
Military operations of the Chinese Civil War
Marching
1927 in China